The Boquillas Port of Entry is a port of entry into the United States from the Mexican town of Boquillas del Carmen to Big Bend National Park.  Having opened in April 2013, it is a port of entry that is unstaffed by Customs and Border Protection agents, but at least one National Park Service employee is present while the port of entry is open.  Persons entering from Mexico must report to the video inspection kiosks.  Crossing of the Rio Grande may be accomplished by foot, rowboat or burro.  Previously, the Boquillas Port of Entry had been an informal border crossing for several decades, but was closed in May 2002.  It is the only unstaffed legal border crossing on the US-Mexico border and one of only four that allow only pedestrian traffic.

History 

The Boquillas crossing existed for decades as an informal and unenforced crossing point between Mexico and Texas, used by people from both countries.

References

See also

 List of Mexico–United States border crossings

Mexico–United States border crossings
2013 establishments in Texas
Buildings and structures completed in 2013
Buildings and structures in Brewster County, Texas
Big Bend National Park